Mihail Karushkov (born 28 October 1940) is a retired Bulgarian football goalkeeper.

References

1940 births
Living people
Bulgarian footballers
FC Arda Kardzhali players
Botev Plovdiv players
Bulgaria international footballers
Association football goalkeepers